Marcus A. Milam K-8 Center, usually referred to as M.A. Milam K-8 Center, or Milam, is located at 6020 West 16th Avenue Hialeah, Florida 33012. M.A. Milam serves as an elementary middle school or "K-8 center". Established as an elementary school in 1961 to serve the West Hialeah area, the school was expanded to serve as a K-8 school in 1998. It was named after Marcus A. Milam, a dairy pioneer and businessman. The school mascot is the colt. The school colors are white and hunter green, which are incorporated into the mandatory uniform policy.

Anna M. Hernandez assumed the position of principal at the beginning of the 2008–2009 school year, succeeding Dr. Robert G. Valenzuela.

History
In 1961, the school was built on the grounds of the former pasture land used by businessman M.A. Milam, and was established as M.A. Milam Elementary School. In the school's inaugural year, 10 teachers educated 340 students.

The school's conversion from an elementary to a K-8 institution was initiated on December 10, 1997. The Middle Learning Center, often referred to as the MLC, was opened in the 1998–1999 school year, and the first Milam eighth grade class was the Class of 2001.

During the 2001–2002 school year's 4th grading period, the school had 100% attendance.

The MLC was named in honor of former principal, Dr. Valenzuela's semifinal status for Principal of the Year during the 2004–2005 school year.

School grades
Milam has a consistent record of scoring as an "A" or "B" school in the State FCAT grading system. This consistency began in the 2000–01 school year, when the school grade went from a "D" to an "A".

Traditions
The school's 8th grade Leadership Circle announces and passes down their position to the new leadership circle on the final day of the school year.

M.A. Milam K-8 Center hosts an annual prom, exclusive to 8th graders.

Every year, the school's administration announces the annual chocolate fundraiser hosted by World's Finest Chocolate. In January 2012, World's Finest Chocolate unveiled their record-setting 12,000 pound chocolate bar at the school to start the 2011-2012 fundraiser.

The school's drama class puts on a winter and end-of-the-year spring show each school year. The school's level two and three drama students are also known as Troupe 88685 The troupe is currently led by Nicole Mujica. They have gone to district and state regional competitions for several years, most times winning Superior or Excellent awards. The school performs a Cuban Independence "Veinte de Mayo" show in May for the Miami-Dade County School Board. The show is performed to celebrate Cuban culture and history, as many of the students in the school are from Cuba.

Extracurricular activities and clubs
The first Milam NJHS was formed during the 2004–2005 school year with efforts from math teacher and Class of 2005 sponsor  Frances Gomez and the Milam Class of 2005. Nicole Mujica is the current NJHS sponsor as of 2012.

The Milam SECME program has thrived since the 2002–2003 school year, under Norberto Fernandez and Andres Vega, when the school placed second and third at many competitions. The school peaked in achievement during the 2004–2005 school year, when it received numerous gold, silver and bronze awards. The school has placed anywhere from first to fifth in the national SECME mousetrap car champion, under the leadership of the sponsor of that competition, Andres Vega.

The school's chess club is led and run by Mr. Rivas. The club participates in various chess competitions.

The school is part of the "After-School All-Stars" program. Student Bryan Jardines was a member of the third annual All-Stars Youth Advisory Board.

The school does not offer any official athletic teams. However, ALM Sports offers extra-curricular athletic programs, including a flag football squad, a basketball team, a soccer team, and a dance team.

Honors
Milam was the "Do The Right Thing" winner, for having the most finalists in the program for all of the Dade Middle Schools, in the 2004–2005 school year. In the years since, Milam students have consistently placed in the top ten winners.

During the 2004–2005 school year, Milam's principal, Dr. Robert G. Valenzuela, was a finalist for Principal of the Year.

Milam was the district winner for the middle school division of SECME in Miami-Dade County during the 2004–2005 school year. The 2004-2005 Milam Mousetrap team won SECME nationals in North Carolina. The 2010-2011 Milam Mousetrap team was the district winner for the middle and high school division of SECME in regionals, and placed second in nationals. The 2011-2012 Milam Mousetrap team was the district winner for the middle and high school division of SECME in Florida regionals, and placed second in nationals.

In April 2013, the school's Chess Club participated in the largest chess tournament in history, located in Nashville, Tennessee, taking home the seventh-place trophy in the K-9 Unrated Section.

In January 2014, Principal Hernandez was chosen as one of the six best principals in Florida, according to an analysis released by Florida State University and Florida TaxWatch. The analysis recognized the principals from at-risk schools which displayed major learning gains in reading and math.

Notable people associated with Milam

Educators
Anna M. Hernandez, principal
Lizbet Martinez, language arts teacher who became famous in 1994

Alumni
Jason Carmona, a marine for whom M.A. Milam K-8 Center held a special welcome home event in 2012
Willy Ferrer, politician

References

See also
 Miami-Dade County Public Schools
 Education in the United States

Educational institutions established in 1961
Public K–8 schools in Florida
Miami-Dade County Public Schools schools
Elementary schools in Miami-Dade County, Florida
Middle schools in Miami-Dade County, Florida
Education in Hialeah, Florida
1961 establishments in Florida